was a Japanese engineer who studied and worked in Scotland, United Kingdom during the 1880s. He was one of the first Japanese engineers who came to study in the UK. He is best known for his work with Sir John Fowler and Sir Benjamin Baker in cantilever bridge construction, notably on the Forth Bridge.

Watanabe studied under Henry Dyer, the Scottish engineer associated with technical education in Japan. After obtaining a degree from the Faculty of Technology of the University of Tokyo, he studied at the University of Glasgow from 1885 and graduated with a Civil Engineering and Bachelor of Science degree, and worked as a construction foreman on the Forth Bridge, which crossed the Firth of Forth in eastern Scotland in 1890.

Watanabe's image became well known in the 1887 photograph illustrating the cantilever principle, in which he poses with Fowler and Baker, suspended between the engineers who form a cantilever structure with their arms.

Conductor Takashi Asahina was the illegitimate son of Watanabe.

References

1858 births
1932 deaths
Bridge engineers
Alumni of the University of Glasgow
University of Tokyo alumni
People from Nagano Prefecture